Maccabi Nahalat Yitzhak Tel Aviv is a futsal club based in Tel Aviv, israel. The club was founded in 2010, and plays in the Israeli futsal premier league and other domestic and international competitions.

History 
Maccabi Nahalat Yitzhak Tel Aviv was founded in 2010 by two childhood friends: Hen Levincron and Doron Chicko, the first team's members were friends who grew up together from kindergarten in the small neighborhood, Nahalat Yitzhak, in the city Tel Aviv, Israel. Since that moment, the club's vision and DNA is based on great friendship between all members.

Honours

National 

 5 Championships : 2011/12, 2016/17, 2017/18, 2018 (outdoor), 2018/19

International 

 UEFA Futsal Cup Perliminary Round:
 2rd place : 2012/13
 3rd place : 2017/18
 3rd place : 2018/19
 Amsterdam Tournament 2014 : Winners
 European Maccabi Games 2015 Berlin: Silver Medal
 F5WC World Cup 2018: Semi Final

Current squad

UEFA Club Competitions record

UEFA Futsal Cup

References

External links 
 Club's Profile at the israeli football association web site
 Club's Profile at the uefa.com

Futsal clubs
Sport in Israel